The 1957–58 season is the 78th season of competitive football by Rangers.

Overview
Rangers played a total of 54 competitive matches during the 1957–58 season.

Results
All results are written with Rangers' score first.

Scottish First Division

Scottish Cup

League Cup

European Cup

Appearances

See also
 1957–58 in Scottish football
 1957–58 Scottish Cup
 1957–58 Scottish League Cup
 1957–58 European Cup

References 

Rangers F.C. seasons
Rangers